Blaydes' Yard was a private shipbuilder in Kingston upon Hull, England, founded in the 18th century which fulfilled multiple Royal Navy contracts. Her most notable ship was HMS Bounty  famed for its mutiny.

History

Hugh Blaydes was born in 1686 and started building ships with his sons in 1740. Their yard was at Hessle Cliff on the Humber Estuary on the edge of Kingston upon Hull. They had a second North End Yard close to their home at 6 High Street (now known as Blaydes House).

By the 1780s the yard was being run by Benjamin Blaydes, Hugh's grandson. The Blaydes family were very prominent in Hull and provided three mayors: Joseph (1636/7), Benjamin (1771/2), Benjamin (1788).

Blaydes Street in Hull, a traditional two storey brick street is named after the family. The family created the company of Blaydes, Loft, Gee & Co. shipowners.

James Blaydes married Ann Marvell, sister of Andrew Marvell. Later members of the family left Hull and moved to Ranby Hall, a large country estate.

Their descendants included Frederick Henry Marvell Blaydes and Sir Rowland Blades, Lord Mayor of London.

Blydes' North End Yard has been chosen as the new home of the Arctic Corsair.

Notable ships
HMS Success, 1740
HMS Adventure, 1741
HMS Anglesea, 1742
HMS Poole, 1745
HMS Raven, 1745
HMS Centaur, 1746
HMS Tavistock, 1747
HMS Scarborough, 1756
HMS Rose, 1757
HMS Temple, 1758
HMS Tweed, 1759
HMS Mermaid, 1761
HMS Ardent, 1764
HMS Diamond, 1774
HMS Boreas, 1774, captained by Horatio Nelson
HMS Bounty, 1784, built as Bethia and converted 1787

See also

Earle's Shipbuilding also in Hull

References
 

British shipbuilders
Industry in Kingston upon Hull